Colby Lake may refer to:

Colby Lake (Chisago County, Minnesota)
Colby Lake (Washington County, Minnesota)